One of the uninhabited Baffin Island offshore island groups in Cumberland Sound, the Kaigosuit Islands are located long the south side of Nettilling Fiord, and southwest of Pangnirtung. The Kaigosuiyat Islands run parallel to the south. Further south is Irvine Inlet. The Kaigosuits are part of the Qikiqtaaluk Region, in the Canadian territory of Nunavut.

References

External links 
 Kaigosuit Islands in the Atlas of Canada - Toporama; Natural Resources Canada

Islands of Cumberland Sound
Archipelagoes of Baffin Island
Uninhabited islands of Qikiqtaaluk Region